Hygophum is a genus of lanternfishes.

Species
There are currently nine recognized species in this genus:
 Hygophum atratum (Garman, 1899) (Thickhead lanternfish)
 Hygophum benoiti (Cocco, 1838) (Benoit's lanternfish)
 Hygophum bruuni Wisner, 1971
 Hygophum hanseni (Tåning, 1932) (Hansen's lanternfish)
 Hygophum hygomii (Lütken, 1892) (Bermuda lantern fish)
 Hygophum macrochir (Günther, 1864) (Large-finned lanternfish)
 Hygophum proximum Becker, 1965 (Firefly lanternfish)
 Hygophum reinhardtii (Lütken, 1892) (Reinhardt's lantern fish)
 Hygophum taaningi Becker, 1965

References

Myctophidae
Marine fish genera
Taxa named by Rolf Ling Bolin